Primera Fila:Hecho Realidad is the first live album by American Latin pop duo Ha*Ash. It was released under the label Sony Music Latin on 11 November 2014. The album was recorded in Lake Charles, Louisiana and Ciudad de México on 7 July 2014, with a selected audience to attend the concert.

The album includes material from her past four studio albums as well as 8 newly recorded songs. The album features collaborations by several performers, including Julio Ramírez, Maluma, Joy Huerta, Matisse, and Axel, among others. Ha*Ash worked with producers George Noriega, Pablo De La Loza, and Tim Mitchell. Six singles were released from Primera Fila: Hecho Realidad worldwide. "Perdón, Perdón" was released as the lead single in September 2014. The other songs released were "Lo Aprendí de Ti", "Ex de Verdad",  "No Te Quiero Nada",  "Dos Copas de Más", and "Sé Que Te Vas".

Background and production 
The album includes material from her past five studio albums as well as 8 newly recorded songs. This production includes hits and new tracks featuring Maluma, Joy Huerta, Julio Ramirez (Reik), Axel, Matisse, and a gospel choir. The album was recorded in front of a selected audience to attend the concert located in Mexico City. The CD/DVD has images from their hometown in Lake Charles, Louisiana and a live concert filmed in Estudios Churubusco. Ha*Ash worked with producers George Noriega, Pablo De La Loza, and Tim Mitchell.

Album concept 
Primera Fila is a "concept" strategy created by Sony Music Latin and initially aiming to present some of the top Latin artists while directly recording their music material before a small number of attendants. This "unplugged" format that would present artists in their most intimate and personal performance was the main concept of Primera Fila. Ha*Ash is the youngest group to record a Primera Fila concept album.

Release and promotion 
In the United States and Mexico, the standard edition of the album was released exclusively on 11 November 2014. The Blu-ray edition was released in November 2014. The Mexican deluxe edition of Primera Fila: Hecho realidad includes the concert DVD, a live audio CD was made available on 13 November 2015. The DVD and Blu-ray editions feature the entire concert, as well as over an exclusive documentary, while the two CDs include the audio from the main performances. In Europe and Latin America the deluxe edition of Primera Fila: Hecho realidad was released on 4 March 2016.

Singles 
Six singles have been released in support of the parent album. "Perdón, Perdón", was released on 22 September 2014 as the lead single. The track peaked at number 17 in the Latin Pop Songs, number 36 in the Hot Latin songs and at number 35 in the Latin Airplay charts in the United States. In Mexico, the song peaked at number one on the Mexican Singles Chart, and Monitor Latino. The second single, "Lo Aprendí de Ti" was released on 6 March 2015. The track peaked at number one on the Mexican Singles Chart and Monitor Latino. In the United States the song peaked at number 19 in the Latin Pop Songs, number 32 in the Hot Latin songs and at number 59 in the Latin Airplay.

The other songs released were "Ex de Verdad". The track peaked at number one on the Monitor Latino on México. "No Te Quiero Nada" (with Axel) which was previously released as a single from her third album Habitación Doble, was re-released as the album's second digital single on 30 September 2015. The track peaked at number one on the Monitor Latino on México. The music video of the song is the live performance by Ha*Ash in Lake Charles, Louisiana.

"Dos Copas de Más", was released as the album's fifth single on 4 November 2015; The track peaked at number 49 in the Latin Pop Songs In Mexico, the song peaked at number three on the Mexican Singles Chart, and Monitor Latino. On 26 January April 2016, the track "Sé Que Te Vas", launched in was released as the album's six single and was accompanied by a music video. The track peaked at number 28 in the Mexico Espanol Airplay and at number 16 in the Monitor Latino on México.

Tour 

To promote the album, Ha*Ash embarked on a world concert tour during 2015 and 2017. The "1F Hecho Realidad Tour" is a concert tour performed by Ha*Ash visited North America, Europe and Latin America. The 196-show tour began in the National Auditorium of Mexico City on 25 April 2015 and ended two year later.

Commercial performance 
The album achieved immense success in Mexico, debuting a top of the country's both physical and digital album charts.  In the United States, it peak at number 16 in Latin Pop album charts, published by Billboard. Primera Fila: Hecho Realidad was certified gold one week after its release in Mexico for shipments of over 30,000 copies, according to the AMPROFON. The same month was certified as Platinum, subsequently as Double Platinum, then as Double Platinum and Gold for exceeding sales of 150,000 sold copies in 2016.

By the end of 2016, Sony Music informed that the album had been certified as gold in Argentina and platinum in Colombia. In the territory of Central America the album achieved platinum certification by the end of 2017 for sales over 20,000 copies. In 2018, the album was certified as Quadruple Platinum in Mexico. In June 2018, it had already been certified as double platinum in Peru for sales exceeding 40,000 copies. In December 2018, it was announced by AMPROFON that the album had achieved a quadruple platinum and gold certification, which equals 270,000 copies sold. As of November 2018, Primera Fila: Hecho Realidad had sold near 600,000 copies worldwide. On September 23, the album was certified as Diamond and gold.

Track listing 

Notes
  signifies an additional producer

Formats
CD;–  includes the 14-track album.
CD and DVD (Mexican edition) – Digipak case edition containing three discs: DVD of the concert and two CD containing 23 live tracks.
CD and DVD (Europe edition) – Digipak case edition containing three discs: DVD of the concert and two CD containing 24 live tracks.
Blu-ray – Blu-ray case edition containing: High Definition version of the concert on Blu-ray.
Digital download;– contains the 14 tracks from the CD release.
Digital download (Mexican edition);– contains the 23 tracks from the CD release, two videos and a documentary.
Digital download (Europe edition);– contains the 24 tracks from the CD release, three videos and a documentary.

Credits and personnel 
Credits adapted from the liner notes of the Mexican deluxe edition of Primera Fila: Hecho Realidad.

Musicians

 Ashley Grace – vocals , guitar  
 Hanna Nicole – vocals , guitar , keyboards , mandoline 
 Pablo De La Loza: background Vocals , keyboards 
 Tim Mitchell: background Vocals , guitar 
 Uri Natenzon: bass 
 Ben Peeler: guitar  lap steel guitar , mandoline 
 Ezequiel Ghilardi: drums 
 Jules Ramllano: drums , guitar , keyboards 
 Álex Gómez: drums  , percussion 
 Julio Ramírez: background Vocals  guitar 
 Joy Huerta: vocals 
 Axel: vocals  guitar 
 Román Torres: vocals  guitar 
 Pablo Preciado: vocals  guitar 
 Melissa Robles: vocals 
 Maluma: vocals 
 Concetta costanzo: background vocals

Production

 Tim Mitchell: producer , programmer , arrangements , additional engineer 
 George Noriega: producer , programmer , arrangements , additional engineer 
 Pablo De La Loza: co-producer , programmer , arrangements , additional engineer 
 Rodolfo Vásquez: producer , mastering 
 Jules Ramllano: producer , mixing , ingeniería 
 Brad Blackwood: mastering engineering 
 Juan Pablo Fallucca: recording engineer 
 Charles Dye: mixing engineer 
 Dave Clauss: mixing engineer 
 Quaz: recording engineer 
 Samuel De Leo: arrangements , assistant mixer 
 Memo Parra: arrangements , assistant mixer 
 Joel Alonso: engineer 
 Alfonso Palacios: engineer 
 Gerardo Morgado: engineer 
 Mateo Aguilar: arrangements 
 Fernando Ruíz Velasco: arrangements 
 Rodrigo Duarte: arrangements 
 Edy Vega: arrangements 
 Lary Ruíz Velasco: arrangements 
 Roberto Collío: engineer

Design

 Paul Forat: A&R
 Raúl Ruiz Alarcón: A&R
 Gonzalo Herrerías: A&R
 Nahuel Lerena: video director, video editor
 Pato Byrne: video editor
 Vicente Solís: video Management
 Aldo Ballasteros: video Management
 Chino Lemus: album Artwork photographer
 David Zepeda: graphic and logo design
 Ricardo Villarreal: photography
 Jennifer Pochat: documentary Director

Charts

Weekly charts

Year-end charts

Certifications

Release history

References

External links 
 ha-ash.com
 Sister-duo-Ha-Ash-Houston

Ha*Ash live albums
Ha*Ash video albums
2014 video albums
2014 live albums
Spanish-language live albums
Spanish-language video albums
Primera Fila albums
Sony Music Latin live albums
Sony Music Latin video albums